Catriona signifera is a species of sea slug, an aeolid nudibranch, a marine gastropod mollusc in the family Trinchesiidae.

Distribution
This species was described from Tannowa, Osaka Bay, on the shore (March 1951 and 1959, 12 specimens, collected by Mr. Hamatani) and Mukaishima, Seto Inland Sea, on Sargassum weed in shallow water (March 1960, 27 specimens, collected by Dr. lnaba).

Description
This species has sometimes been considered to be a synonym of Diaphoreolis viridis, but unlike that species, it has oval spots of white pigment on the cerata and white rhinophores and oral tentacles. There is an ovoid brown or black mark on the back, behind the rhinophores.

References

Trinchesiidae
Gastropods described in 1961